Wong Leng (literally: "Yellow Ridge") is on section 9 of the Wilson Trail in Pat Sin Leng Country Park, Hong Kong. It is 639 metres tall.

See also

 List of mountains, peaks and hills in Hong Kong
Pat Sin Leng

References

Mountains, peaks and hills of Hong Kong
Tai Po District